Dorea may refer to:

 Dorea
 Dorea (cloth)
 Dorea longicatena
 Dorea formicigenerans
 Dorea Sand